Qarah Vali or Qareh Vali, also rendered as Qaravali or Qarawali, may refer to:
 Qarah Vali, Ardabil, Iran
 Qarah Vali, East Azerbaijan, Iran
 Qarah Vali, Kermanshah, Iran
 Qareh Vali, Zanjan, Iran

See also
 Qaravəlli (disambiguation), places in Azerbaijan